Craig Wrolstad (born September 5, 1965) is an American football official  in the National Football League (NFL) since the 2003 NFL season, wearing uniform number 4.

As an official in the NFL, Wrolstad is known for working Super Bowl XLVII in 2013 as a field judge. He wore uniform number 89 and 4 as a field judge.

Personal life
He went to Middle School (7 8 9) at Meeker Junior High (now Meeker Middle School), and went to high school at Lindbergh High School 

Wrolstad resides in Lake Tapps, Washington.

Outside of the NFL, Wrolstad is a high school athletic director at Seattle Christian School.

Officiating career

Early years
Wrolstad served several seasons in NFL Europe, including three seasons as a referee. Prior to entering the NFL, Wrolstad was in the Pacific-10 Conference and the Arena Football League.

NFL career
Wrolstad was hired by the NFL in 2003 as a field judge, and was promoted to referee with the start of the 2014 NFL season following the retirements of Ron Winter and Scott Green. Wrolstad wore uniform number 89 as a field judge, then switched to number 4 upon his promotion. Number 4 was previously worn by Bruce Finlayson, Bill Kingzett and Doug Toole.

Wrolstad was named the alternate referee of Super Bowl LII, which was held at U.S. Bank Stadium in Minneapolis.

Wrolstad was named the referee of 2020 Pro Bowl, which was held at Camping World Stadium in Orlando, Florida.

2022 Crew 

 R: Craig Wrolstad
 U: Steve Woods
 DJ: Jim Mello
 LJ: Tripp Sutter
 FJ: Jeff Shears
 SJ: Jeff Lamberth
 BJ: Grantis Bell
 RO: Kevin Stine
 RA: Gavin Anderson

References

1965 births
Living people
National Football League officials